The N6 road is a national primary road in Ireland from junction 11 on the M4 motorway at Kinnegad to Galway city. The N6 and N4 form a continuous motorway or dual carriageway from Dublin city centre to Galway City passing in an east–west direction through the midlands of Ireland. Most of the road is motorway standard (designated as M6 motorway) with the exception of the Athlone bypass and stretches of urban road in Galway City, which are the only sections of the road that remain designated as N6 dual carriageway. There is one toll on the road outside Galway city. Major upgrades to the road were completed in December 2009 completing the first intercity motorway/dual carriageway in Ireland and the New Junctions of M6 are built and will be 164 km.

History
Prior to the 2005–2009 construction of the road currently designated as the N6, the designation applied to the older, parallel Dublin–Galway route which went directly through most of the now bypassed towns from Kinnegad to Galway.  That route is now mostly designated as R446, except the Athlone bypass which forms part of the new N6, a small section near Athlone now part of the N62 and a small section near Loughrea now part of the N65.

Route

The N6 route commences directly south of Kinnegad in County Meath as the M6 motorway. The road runs west into County Westmeath and bypasses Rochfordbridge, with the N52 joining the M6 east of Tyrrellspass. The N6 continues west, with the N52 leaving the route south of Kilbeggan. The route leaves Westmeath after bypassing Horseleap, continues west into County Offaly, and re-enters Westmeath  bypassing Moate.

The route bypasses Fardrum (where the N62 begins, leaving the N6 to the south) heading west towards Athlone. The route follows a dual carriageway bypass of Athlone around the northern side of the town, crossing the River Shannon into County Roscommon. This part of the route is non-motorway standard. Along the dual carriageway there are local access junctions, as well as junctions for the N55 and N61.

After the Athlone bypass, motorway restrictions are re-enforced and the route continues as the M6. The route bypasses Ballinasloe over River Suck into County Galway. Further west at Kilmeen, the N65 commences, leaving the M6 to the south. Loughrea is bypassed to the north by a route opened in November 2005. The River Dunkellin is crossed by the M6 at Craughwell as it continues west towards Galway. Outside the city itself, Oranmore is bypassed to the west and north, where the M18 crosses the M6. This dual carriageway bypass brings the route into Galway itself, where it meets the N83 along Bóthar na dTreabh. The Headford Road, Quincentenary Bridge across the River Corrib and Quincentenary Bridge Approach Road bring the N6 through Galway itself to meet the N59 on the western side of the city.

Map of Route
 Route of N6 overlaid on Google Maps

Upgrade to Motorway (M6) Transport 21

Junctions

Until 2011 there were two junction numbering schemes on the N6 route. The M6 junction numbers below are used on the entire length of the road. The Athlone bypass had a separate numbering scheme (J1–J6) but was renumbered to its current form (J8–J13) following the upgrade of the bypass in 2011.

See also
Roads in Ireland 
Motorways in Ireland
National secondary road
Regional road

References

External links
Roads Act 1993 (Classification of National Roads) Order 2006 – Department of Transport
N6 Galway to Ballinasloe – Galway County Council
N6 Ballinasloe to Athlone Dual Carriageway – Roscommon County Council
N6 Galway City Outer Bypass

06
Roads in County Meath
Roads in County Westmeath
Roads in County Offaly
Roads in County Roscommon
Roads in County Galway